This is a list of Brazilian films of the 2010s. For a complete alphabetical list, see :Category:Brazilian films.

2010
 Brazilian films of 2010

2011
 Brazilian films of 2011

2012
 Brazilian films of 2012

2013
 Brazilian films of 2013

2014
 Brazilian films of 2014

2015
 Brazilian films of 2015

2016
 Brazilian films of 2016

2017
 Brazilian films of 2017

2018
 Brazilian films of 2018

2019
 Brazilian films of 2019

External links
 Brazilian film at the Internet Movie Database

Brazilian
Films